A side effect is an effect that is secondary to the one intended.

Side effect or side effects may also refer to:

Computer science
 Side effect (computer science), a state change caused by a function or expression

Medicine
 Side effect (medicine), an unintended effect of the use of a drug

Media
 Side Effects (Allen book), a 1986 collection of short stories by Woody Allen
 Side Effects (Bass book), a 2008 nonfiction book by Alison Bass
 Side Effects (TV series), a Canadian TV series
 "Side Effects" (Ben 10 episode), an episode of television series Ben 10

Film
 Side Effects (2005 film), starring Katherine Heigl
 Side Effects (2013 film), directed by Steven Soderbergh
 The Side Effect, a 2014 film directed by Ti West

Music
 Side Effect, a 1970s soul band
 Side Effect (album), a 1975 album by R&B group Side Effect
 The Side Effects, a 1980s indie rock band
 Side Effects (Dallas Smith album), 2016
 "Side Effects" (Dallas Smith song)
 "Side Effects" (Mariah Carey song), 2008
 "Side Effects" (Chainsmokers song), 2018
 The Side Effects (album), a 2019 album by Coldrain

See also
 Side reaction
 Side product
 By-product
 Causality
 Unintended consequences